Sarah Brightman in Concert with Orchestra was a concert tour by English soprano singer Sarah Brightman. The tour featured shows in Canada, Japan, Macau, South Korea, and Ukraine.
These performances were from a more traditional classical standpoint. Brightman sang alongside the Prime Philharmonic Orchestra, New Japan Philharmonic, Aichi Chamber Orchestra, Kyoto Philharmonic Chamber orchestra, Orchestra Ensemble Kanazawa, Hong Kong Concert Orchestra and Prime Philharmonic Orchestra in Seoul.

Set list
Act I
 "Overture: Tallis Fantasia"
 "Bailero"
 "La Wally"
 "Serenade"
 "How Fair This Place"
 "Nessun dorma"
 "Interlude: Capriccio Espagnol"
 "It's a Beautiful Day"
 "Stranger in Paradise"
 "Hijo de la Luna"
 "La Luna"

20 minute intermission

Act II
 "Overture: Japanese Garden"
 "What a Wonderful World"
 "Scarborough Fair"
 "He Doesn't See Me"
 "Interlude: Sarahbande"
 "Anytime, Anywhere"
 "Nella Fantasia"
 "Canto della Terra"
 "Wishing You Were Somehow Here Again"
 "Interlude: Phantom of the Opera Overture"
 "The Phantom of the Opera"
 "Time to Say Goodbye"
Encore
 "Running"
 "Ave Maria"
 "Done" (performed in Japan only)

Tour dates

References

Sarah Brightman concert tours
2010 concert tours